Ernesto "Ennis" Hayes (10 May 1896 – 6 February 1956) was an Argentine footballer who played as a forward. He played most of his career at Rosario Central, being also called for the Argentina national team. He is (alongside his brother Harry) the most decorated player in Rosario Central's history, with 20 titles, which include 5 AFA titles and 15 regional honours.

Early and personal life 
Hayes was born in Rosario on 10 May 1896, the son of an English father. His brother Harry was also a notable footballer for Rosario Central, remaining nowadays as the all-time top scorer of the club.

Club career 

He began his club career with Rosario Central at the age of 16, in 1912. A year later he had a brief spell with Club Embarcadero, before returning to Rosario Central, where he remained until 1923, winning several titles. He had brief tenures on Gimnasia y Esgrima de Santa Fe and Tiro Federal before returning to Rosario Central, where he would retire in 1927.

Hayes is credited with 134 goals in 167 games for Rosario Central, ranking second among the all-time top scorers, after his brother Harry. Other statistics state Hayes scored 154 goals in 181 matches.

Hayes retired from playing on 17 April 1927, against arch-rival Newell's Old Boys. Hayes also remained the second top scorer of the Rosario derby with 9 goals, after his brother Harry (24).

International career 
Hayes earned 11 caps for the Argentina national team between 1915 and 1918, scoring four goals, and winning five friendly titles. He also played the 1916 and 1917 South American Championships.

Playing style 
A skilled player, Hayes played as left insider, sometimes as right insider because of his ability with both legs. On the other hand, he had a conflictive character that brought him some problems. In 1917 Hayes was banned from playing in national competitions after punching a referee in a Copa de Honor MCBA match v Racing. Nevertheless, the punishment was revoked two years later, allowing him to return to competitions. A new controversy came in a match v Club Argentino, when, after dribling all rival defenders and even the goalkeeper, he stopped and sat on the ball waiting for more rivals instead of scoring a goal.

Honours

 Copa de Competencia La Nación: 1913
 Copa Ibarguren: 1915
 Copa Honor MCBA: 1916
 Copa de Competencia Jockey Club: 1916
 Copa Competencia (AAmF): 1920
 Copa Nicasio Vila (8): 1914, 1915, 1916, 1917, 1919, 1923, 1925, 1927
 Copa Damas de Caridad: 1914, 1915, 1916
 Federación Rosarina de Football: 1913
 Asociación Amateurs Rosarina de Football: 1920, 1921
 Copa Estímulo: 1922

Argentina
 Copa Premier Honor Uruguayo: 1915
 Copa Círculo de la Prensa: 1916
 Copa Lipton: 1916, 1918
 Copa Newton: 1918
 Copa Premier Honor Argentino: 1918

Notes

References

1896 births
1956 deaths
Argentine footballers
Argentina international footballers
Rosario Central footballers
Argentino de Rosario footballers
Association football forwards
Argentine people of English descent
Gimnasia y Esgrima de Santa Fe players
Tiro Federal footballers
Footballers from Rosario, Santa Fe